Lio, also known as Premier Album, is the debut album by Belgian pop singer Lio. It features the hit singles "Amoureux solitaires", "Amicalement votre" and her signature song "Le Banana Split".

Singles

Re-Issues
The album was originally released by the record company Ariola (Benelux and Spain), and Arabella (France) in 1980. It was re-released by Warner Music Group in 1996. Finally, a second re-issue by Ze Records followed in 2005 with four bonus tracks, including the extended version of the main hit single "Le Banana Split", "Teenager" (the b-side of "Le Banana Split") and the Spanish version of the single "Amoureux solitaires".

Track listing

According to Lio's autobiography Pop Model, it was her lyricist Jacques Duvall who translated the lyrics of "Lonely Lovers", the original English-language song by French punk band Stinky Toys which became "Amoureux solitaires". However, if composer-guitarist Jacno approved the cover, singer-lyricist Elli Medeiros didn't. In the end, Duvall couldn't have his name in the official credits of the song and didn't get any royalties for it.

Personnel
 Coordinator [Reissue Co-ordination], Liner Notes, Design [Digipak & Booklet Design] – Michel Esteban
 Design [Original Art Cover Design] – Marc Borgers
 Photography [Photos Booklet] – Guido Marco
 Producer – Dan Lacksman (tracks: 1 to 5, 7 to 16), Marc Moulin (tracks: 1 to 5, 7 to 16)
 Recorded By – Alan Ward
 Remastered By – Charlus de la Salle

Charts

Certifications

B-sides

References

1980 debut albums
Lio albums
ZE Records albums